Wheelchair fencing at the 1992 Summer Paralympics consisted of fourteen events, nine for men and five for women.

Medal summary

Men's events

Women's events

Medal table

References 

 

1992 Summer Paralympics events
1992
Paralympics
International fencing competitions hosted by Spain